Grant Avenue in San Francisco, California, is one of the oldest streets in the city's Chinatown district. It runs in a north–south direction starting at Market Street in the heart of downtown and dead-ending past Francisco Street in the North Beach district. It resumes at North Point Street and stretches one block to The Embarcadero and the foot of Pier 39.

Grant Avenue is primarily a one-way street; automobile traffic can travel only northbound. In 2012, however, the two blocks of Grant Avenue between Sutter and Geary streets were converted to two-way traffic in order to ease southbound traffic congestion during the multi-year closure of Stockton Street, part of the construction plan for the Central Subway.

History

In 1835, the very first housing structure of Yerba Buena (the later San Francisco) was erected by William A. Richardson at what today is Grant Avenue, between Clay and Washington streets.

When California came under the control of the United States following the Mexican–American War of 1846–1848, the street now called Grant was named Dupont Street, in honor of a Naval admiral from the USS Portsmouth (Portsmouth Square, located one block east, was named after that ship). In the following years, Dupont Street became the location for various opium dens, brothels, and Tong wars.

When San Francisco was rebuilt after being leveled in the 1906 earthquake, Dupont Street was upgraded and given a new name: Grant Avenue, after President Ulysses S. Grant.

Today, the intersection of Grant Avenue and Bush Street marks the southern entrance to Chinatown. Grant Avenue is still written and said in Chinese as "Du Pon Gai" (都板街, Gai 街 means street).

References

External links

SanFranciscoChinatown.com: Grant Avenue in San Francisco

Chinatown, San Francisco
North Beach, San Francisco
Streets in San Francisco